Dosso v. Federation of Pakistan was the first constitutional case after the promulgation of Constitution of Pakistan of 1956 and an important case in Pakistan's political history. The case got prominence as it indirectly questioned the first martial law imposed by President Iskander Mirza in 1958.

Dosso was the tribal person from district Loralai in Baluchistan then under Provincially Administered Tribal Areas who committed a murder and got arrested by tribal authorities and handed over to Loya jirga which convicted him under Frontier Crimes Regulation (FCR). Relatives of Dosso challenged the decision in Lahore High Court (then the West Pakistan High Court) which ruled in favour of Dosso. Federal Government went on to the Supreme Court of Pakistan which reversed the High Court's decision by referring to the Hans Kelsen theory of legal positivism famously the doctrine of necessity.

Case facts 
Dosso a resident of tribal district Loralai committed a murder and got arrested by the Levis Forces which handed him over to the tribal authorities where he was trialed by Loya Jirga. He was charged for murder under the section 11 of the FCR 1901 and was convicted for it by Loya Jirga. Dosso's relatives challenged the decision of Loya Jirga in Lahore High Court. The High Court considered the case according to the 1956 constitution of Pakistan and ruled in favour of Dosso. The High Court declared that FCR is against the constitution and Dosso is entitled to equality before law under article 5 & 7 of the constitution. Loya Jirga's decision was declared null and void. Federal Government of Pakistan filed an appeal in Supreme Court of Pakistan against the verdict of High Court.

Hearing in High Court 
Relatives of Dosso filed a petition against his conviction by Loya Jirga in West Pakistan High Court (Lahore High Court) that he is the citizen of Pakistan and being a citizen of Pakistan he must be tried according to the Pakistani laws, not the FCR. Articles 5 of the Constitution of Pakistan of 1956 states that all citizens are equal before law and under article 7 enjoy equal protection of the constitution. Dosso's relatives also challenged the relevant provisions of FCR considering them against the article 5 and 7 of the constitution.

Judgement 
High Court decided the case in favour of Dosso and declared that FCR is against the 1956 Constitution. The Constitution of Pakistan ensures the equality and protection of citizens and declared the proceedings of Loya Jirga as null and void.

Legal effects of the judgement 
The effect of Lahore High Court's decision was that after declaring FCR against the constitution and proceedings of Loya Jirga as null and void, the cases which were decided since the promulgation of new constitution of 1956 were in question. It was said that if conviction of Loya Jirga in Dosso case is declared null and void then what about the previous convictions of Loya Jirga after promulgation of Constitution in 1956.

Supreme Court's hearing 
Federal Government of Pakistan appealed against the decision of Lahore High Court in the Supreme Court of Pakistan and Supreme Court set the hearing date for the case on 13 October 1958.

First Martial law 1958 
On 7 October 1958, a harsh change came in the political history of Pakistan. President Iskander Mirza imposed first martial law of the country and made Commander-in-Chief of Pakistan Army General Ayub Khan as Chief Martial Law Administrator (CMLA). All of the government machinery; legislatures, central and provincial were dissolved.

After three days of martial law, an order named Laws (Continuance in Force) Order 1958 was issued by CMLA Ayub Khan. This order was a new legal order which replaced the old legal order i.e. The Constitution of Pakistan 1956. The legal order validated all the laws other than constitution of 1956 and restored the jurisdiction of all courts.

Impacts of Martial law on the case 
Martial law impacted the case significantly and raised some technical points that if Supreme Court maintains the decision of Lahore High Court, it meant that constitution was still in force because the Lahore High Court decided the case under article 5 and 7 of the Constitution of Pakistan 1956. Also if the constitution was still in force then what will be the status of martial law regulations and Laws (Continuance in Force) Order 1958 as it also challenged the martial law administration.

Judgement 
The Supreme Court after restoration decided the case against the decision of Lahore High Court with sole dissenting note by Justice Cornelius. Supreme Court bench headed by Justice Munir based its decision on Hans Kelsen's General Theory of Law and State.

Main aspects of judgement 
The judgment legitimized the martial law of 1958 as a bloodless coup and a kind of peaceful revolution which was not resisted or opposed by the public implied that public is satisfied with this change or revolution, so therefore this martial law is legit. According to the Supreme Court, Laws (Continuance in Force) Order 1958 is the new legal order instead of Constitution of Pakistan 1956 which got abrogated and the validity of a law is determined by this new legal order. Furthermore, it was held that the constitution is abrogated, therefore FCR 1901 is in force according to the Laws (Continuance in Force) Order 1958 which validated the decision of Loya jirga.

Significance 
Dosso case has a far reaching effect on the political history of Pakistan. The recognition of martial law and with the reborn of Kelsen's theory which afterwards was applied in many other cases in Pakistan as well as in the outer world.

Politics of Pakistan 
Supreme Court's judgement in Dosso case greatly impacted the politics in Pakistan and opened the doors for the future martial laws in the country. Legitimization of martial law given power to CMLA Ayub Khan who used it to rule the country for next 10–11 years. Democratic process in the country was crippled which had recently been on the road after the promulgation of 1st constitution in 1956 and made the country to run on the track of dictatorship. Military was encouraged by it for future interventions which occurred three times afterwards. The decision also deprived country of its first constitution just after two years of its promulgation after the struggle of 9 long years. Abrogation of the 1956 Constitution also disturbed the ties between East and West Pakistan which were recently settled by establishing parity between both wings and incorporating both Urdu and Bengali as national language. The decision of the Supreme Court re-validated the British implied legacy of Frontier Crimes Regulation, which was known as the Black Law continued to be enforced in the tribal region till 2018.

Independence of Judiciary 
The decision of the Supreme Court of Pakistan was a serious blow to the independence of judiciary and judiciary was bound to render its service under new legal order. The decision also deprived the courts to hear appeals against the action of government. The judiciary once again bowed down in front of executive in this case and concept of separation of powers further diminished.

See also 
 Federation of Pakistan v. Maulvi Tamizuddin Khan
 1958 Pakistani coup d'état

References

Bibliography 

Pakistani constitutional law
Supreme Court of Pakistan cases
Martial law
Pakistan Army